The Diddakoi is a 1972 children's novel by Rumer Godden. Set in England, it features an orphan traveller or Romani girl, seven-year-old Kizzy Lovell, who faces persecution, grief, and loss in a hostile, close-knit, village community. The title is an alternative spelling of "didicoy", the Angloromani term for a person of mixed ancestry.

The Diddakoi won the 1972 Whitbread Award in the Children's Book category, honouring the year's best English-language work by a writer based in Britain or Ireland.
It was dramatised as a television serial, Kizzy (1976), which was produced by Dorothea Brooking for the BBC, with Vanessa Furst as Kizzy. Decades later it was adapted as a BBC radio drama of the same name, with Nisa Cole in the lead role.

HarperCollins republished the novel in 2002 under the title Gypsy Girl.

References

Costa Book Award-winning works
British children's novels
1972 British novels
Novels about orphans
Macmillan Publishers books
Fictional representations of Romani people
1972 children's books